The Juan Carlos Onetti Literary Contest is an important literary award in Uruguay.

Established in 2011, they are named after Juan Carlos Onetti, one of the most important Uruguayan fiction writers.

See also
 Uruguayan literature

References

Uruguayan literary awards
2013 establishments in Uruguay
Awards established in 2013